The Talking Machine World was a monthly magazine published in New York City between 1905 and 1928. During that time it was the main trade magazine dealing with phonographs and early sound recordings, including cylinders and discs. In later years it also covered radio products, and during its final year of publication was renamed Talking Machine World and Radio Music Merchant.

The magazine was founded and edited by "Colonel" Edward Lyman Bill (1862-1916), who had been editor of another magazine, The Music Trade Review. Each monthly issue of Talking Machine World had sections on developments in different regions of the United States, together with Canada and the United Kingdom. These included some information on sales in different areas, on new innovations, and on the activities of recording artists. The magazine also featured a wide variety of advertisements for phonographs, other equipment, and new record releases. Issues from 1916 averaged about 100 pages, but by 1920, as the recording industry expanded, issues were routinely over 200 pages in length.

After Bill's death, the magazine was edited by his son, Raymond Bill. The journal seems not to have been published after 1928. Its reports on recording sales were superseded and developed by those in Variety, and later Billboard and Cash Box.

References

External links 

 The Talking Machine World, January 1928
 Lists of Talking Machine World contents, 1926
 Copies of advertisements, 1909
 Biography of Edward Lyman Bill, Encyclopedia of Recorded Sound, Volume 1

Monthly magazines published in the United States
English-language magazines
Magazines established in 1905
Magazines disestablished in 1928
Professional and trade magazines
Defunct magazines published in the United States
Magazines published in New York City
1905 establishments in New York City